Select Fashion is a British fashion retailer with a chain of over 135 stores nationwide. It was founded in the early 1980's and has products including clothing, accessories and footwear. The chain predominately sells clothing aimed at 18-45 year olds  with options for children's clothing. The fashion chain Select has fallen into administration, putting 1,800 jobs at risk.

History 
Select Fashion launched in the 1980's. In 2004, the company developed a strategy to drive the company away from being known as a ‘value’ ladies retailer and instead toward a more fashion forward high-street brand. In 2020, Select moved its Head Office from Kentish town to Edmonton in order to expand its Distribution Center and further develop their website for a more diverse online shopping experience for their customers. Select Fashion went into administration for the first time in 2008 and subsequently underwent a buyout. The chain encountered financial difficulties once again in 2019, leading to another administration and subsequent buyout. In October 2020, a group of garment factories located in Leicester, which had previously supplied products to retailers including Boohoo and Select, were found to be implicated in cases of money laundering and VAT fraud. There is no indication that Select Fashion was aware of the fraudulent activities taking place within its supply chain.

References

External links 
 Official website

Clothing brands of the United Kingdom
Clothing retailers of the United Kingdom